Scientific terminology is the part of the language that is used by scientists in the context of their professional activities. While studying nature, scientists often encounter or create new material or immaterial objects and concepts and are compelled to name them. Many of those names are known only to professionals. However, due to popularization of science, they gradually become part of common languages. Several categories of scientific terminology can be distinguished.

New concepts 

Those are specific notions and terms, e.g.,
nanoarchitectonics,
spintronics - a neologism meaning "spin transport electronics",
spinplasmonics, which are often not yet big enough to create a new field of science. Arguably, introducing many of those terms is unnecessary and can be considered as an attempt to produce something "new", if not scientifically then at least in words.

New materials 
The increasing focus of science on technological applications results in extensive search for new materials having unusual or superior properties. Their names can be categorized into new substances (nanotubes, etc.) and registered trademarks and brand names, such as Teflon. Trademarks and brand names are vast fields on their own and are not covered in this article.

New techniques and devices 
Unlike laser and SQUID, many names of the new devices and techniques are commonly used in full spelling, e.g., scanning tunneling microscope, etc. Some devices like transistor, magnetron, etc., have integrated into our life so much that their names are no longer considered terminology and are rather neologisms.

Alternative meaning of common words 
SIESTA, SQUID and SHRIMP are acronyms distinguished from siesta, squid and shrimp by capitalization. However, there are pairs of scientific terminology and common words, which can only be distinguished by context. Representative examples come from particle physics where certain properties of particles are called flavour, color, but have no relation to conventional flavor and color. Another famous example is frustration used to describe ground state properties in condensed matter physics, and especially in magnetic systems.

Composite words 
Recent scientific activity often creates interdisciplinary fields, for which new names, classified into portmanteau words or syllabic abbreviations, are often created by combining two or more words, sometimes with extra prefixes and suffixes. Examples of those – biotechnology, nanotechnology, etc. – are well known and understood, at least superficially, by most non-scientists.

Elementary particles, quasiparticles and chemical elements 
Progress of particle physics, nuclear physics and atomic physics has resulted in discoveries of new elementary particles and atoms. Their names – quark, gluon, lepton, graviton, neutrino, Higgs boson, mendelevium, etc. – are traditionally given by those people who first discovered them and often include surnames of classical scientists.
Fundamental particles are particles that are not made up by any other particles, such as a quark.

Another group of physics terminology terms, exciton, magnon, phonon, plasmon, phason, polaron, roton etc., refers to quasiparticles – quanta of corresponding excitations (spin, heat, plasma, polarization waves), which do not exist separately and were imagined by theoretists to consistently describe properties of solids and liquids.

Most relevant terminology can be found in the following Wikipedia articles and their links:

Discoveries of the chemical elements
Elementary particle
Quasiparticle
List of quasiparticles
Subatomic particle

(The word plasmon was well-known around the 1900s for a proprietary dried milk manufactured by the International Plasmon Company, which was added to a number of products to make Plasmon Oats, Plasmon Cocoa, and Plasmon Biscuits. Plasmon Biscuits were a popular snack used by Ernest Shackleton in his Antarctic Expedition of 1902.)

Classical and non-vernacular terms and expressions 
In modern science and its applied fields such as technology and medicine, a knowledge of classical languages is not as rigid a prerequisite as it used to be. However, traces of their influence remain. Firstly, languages such as Greek, Latin and Arabic – either directly or via more recently derived languages such as French – have provided not only most of the technical terms used in Western science, but also a de facto vocabulary of roots, prefixes and suffixes for the construction of new terms as required. Echoes of the consequences sound in remarks such as "Television? The word is half Latin and half Greek. No good can come of it." (referring to it being a hybrid word).

A special class of terminology that overwhelmingly is derived from classical sources, is biological classification, in which binomial nomenclature still is most often based on classical origins. The derivations are arbitrary however and can be mixed variously with modernisms, late Latin, and even fictional roots, errors and whims. However, in spite of the chaotic nature of the field, it still is helpful to the biologist to have a good vocabulary of classical roots.

Branches of science that are based, however tenuously, on fields of study known to the ancients, or that were established by more recent workers familiar with Greek and Latin, often use terminology that is fairly correct descriptive Latin, or occasionally Greek. Descriptive human anatomy or works on biological morphology often use such terms, for example, musculus gluteus maximus simply means the "largest rump muscle", where  was the Latin for "little mouse" and the name applied to muscles. During the last two centuries there has been an increasing tendency to modernise the terminology, though how beneficial that might be is subject to discussion. In other descriptive anatomical terms, whether in vertebrates or invertebrates, a frenum (a structure for keeping something in place) is simply the Latin for a bridle; and a foramen (a passage or perforation) also is the actual Latin word.

All such words are so much terminology. It does not much matter whether modern users know that they are classical or not. Some distinct term is necessary for any meaningful concept, and if it is not classical, a modern coinage would not generally be any more comprehensible (consider examples such as "byte" or "dongle"). Another modern use of classical language however, is the subject of often acrimonious debate. It is the use of foreign or classical (commonly Latin) expressions terms, or "tags", where it would be possible to use the vernacular instead. This is common in everyday speech in some circles, saying "" instead of "rest in peace" might be pretension or pleasantry, but in law and science among other fields, there are many Latin expressions in use, where it might be equally practical to use the vernacular. Consider the following discussion of the Latin term "sensu".

Latin, its current relevance or convenience 
There is no definite limit to how sophisticated a level of Latin may be brought to bear in conventional scientific terminology; such convention dates back to the days when nearly all standard communications in such subjects were written in Latin as an international scientific lingua franca. That was not so long ago; from the latter days of the Roman empire, Classical Latin had become the dominant language in learned, civil, diplomatic, legal, and religious communication in many states in Europe. Even after Latin had lost its status as a vernacular, Medieval or Late Latin increasingly became the de facto lingua franca in educated circles during the establishment of the Holy Roman Empire. The peak of the dominance of Latin in such contexts probably was during the Renaissance, but the language only began to lose favour for such purposes in the eighteenth century, and gradually at that. The presence of Latin terms in modern writing is largely the residue of the terminology of old documents.

The expression of fine distinctions in academically correct Latin technical terminology may well help in conveying intended meanings more flexibly and concisely, but the significance of the language need not always be taken seriously. An inspection of any collection of references will produce a range of very variable and dubious usages, and often a great deal of obsessive dispute. In contrast, the authoritative glossary attached to the textbook on Biological Nomenclature produced by the Systematics Association displays a very dismissive attitude to the question; for example, the only relevant entries it presents on the subject of the term sensu are:
 sens. str.: see s.s.
 sens. lat.: see s.l.
 sensu amplo: see s.l.
 s.l., sens. lat., sensu lato : Latin, in the broad sense; i.e. of a taxon, including all its subordinate taxa and/or other taxa sometimes considered as distinct.
 s.s., sens. str., sensu stricto : Latin, in the strict sense, in the narrow sense, i.e. of a taxon, in the sense of the type of its name ; or in the sense of its circumscription by its original describer ; or in the sense of its nominate subordinate taxon (in the case of a taxon with 2 or more subordinate taxa) ; or with the exclusion of similar taxa sometimes united with it.
Such entries suggest that the Systematics Association is not concerned with hair-splitting in the use of the Latin terms.

In informal or non-technical English, to say "strictly speaking" for sensu stricto and "broadly speaking" and so on is valid. Even in formal writing, there is no formal requirement to use the Latin terms rather than the vernacular.

Valid reasons for using these Latin or partly Latin expressions are not points of pretentiousness; they include:
 Tradition: Where the terms and their abbreviations have been used formally for generations and appear repeatedly in records and textbooks in fixed contexts, it can be cumbersome and confusing to change unexpectedly to more familiar English or other vernacular.
 Precision: Vernacular expressions that most nearly correspond to these terms in meaning, might also be understood in subtly or even crashingly misleading senses, whereas the Latin terms are used according to strict conventions that are not easy to mistake in professional circles familiar with the usages.
 Efficiency: Not only are these terms compact (even in comparison to say, broadly speaking and strictly speaking) but in the proper contexts they lend themselves to understandable abbreviation as s.s. and s.l., better than the most compact vernacular expressions. In much the same way, think of etc or &c; practically everyone knows what those mean, and uses them unthinkingly, even people who do not know that they are abbreviations for et cetera or even et caetera, or that those mean "and the rest" in Latin. Even monoglot laymen would not usually trouble to write "and so on" instead of etc.

Acronyms 

A good example is the word laser, an acronym for "Light Amplification by Stimulated Emission of Radiation", and therefore all its letters should be capitalized. However, because of frequent use, this acronym became a neologism, i.e., it has integrated into English and most other languages. Consequently, laser is commonly written in small letters. It has even produced secondary acronyms such as LASIK (Laser-ASsisted in Situ Keratomileusis). A related acronym and neologism maser (Microwave Amplification by Stimulated Emission of Radiation) is much less known. Nevertheless, it is commonly written in small letters. On the contrary, acronym SPASER (Surface Plasmon Amplification by Stimulated Emission of Radiation) is capitalized.

Many scientific acronyms or abbreviations reflect the artistic sense of their  creators, e.g.,
AMANDA – Antarctic Muon And Neutrino Detector Array, a neutrino telescope
BLAST – Balloon-borne Large Aperture Submillimeter Telescope
COMICS – COoled Mid-Infrared Camera and Spectrometer
FROG - Frequency-resolved optical gating
MARVEL – Multi-object Apache Point Observatory Radial Velocity Exoplanet Large-area Survey, a NASA-funded project to search for exoplanets
METATOY – METAmaTerial fOr raYs – a material that changes the direction of transmitted light rays
PLANET – Probing Lensing Anomalies NETwork, a program to search for microlensing events
SCREAM – Single Crystal Reactive Etch And Metallization, a process used in making some microelectromechanical systems (MEMS)
SHRIMP – Sensitive High-Resolution Ion MicroProbe
SIESTA – Spanish Initiative for Electronic Simulations with Thousands of Atoms (siesta = afternoon nap in Spanish)
SPIDER – Spectral Phase Interferometry for Direct Electric-field Reconstruction
SQUID – Superconducting Quantum Interference Device,
etc. (see also List of astronomy acronyms).

See also 

Abbreviations
Acronym
Anacronym
Backronym
International scientific vocabulary
Jargon
List of deprecated terms for diseases
Mathematical jargon
Medical slang
Medical terminology
Neologism
Portmanteau
Retronym

References

External links 
 Science Terminology – Acronyms & Abbreviations [link appears broken (2017-04-23)]
 List of Common Acronyms and Abbreviations Encountered in the CERN Environment
 Abbreviations.com – a human edited database of acronyms and abbreviations
 Acronym Finder – a human edited database of acronyms and abbreviations (over 550,000 entries)
 All Acronyms – collection of acronyms and abbreviations (more than 600,000 definitions)
 Acronym Database – a human edited database of user submitted acronyms and abbreviations
 WDISF – What Does It Stand For is a human edited database of acronyms

 

pl:Język naukowy